John Cadwalader is the name of:

John Cadwalader (general) (1742–1786), Pennsylvanian merchant, general in the Revolutionary War
John Cadwalader (jurist) (1805–1879), American lawyer, jurist and politician
John Lambert Cadwalader (1836–1914), American lawyer, Assistant U.S. Secretary of State